Yenikavak can refer to the following villages in Turkey:

 Yenikavak, Balya
 Yenikavak, Kastamonu